Siméon-François Berneux (14 May 1814 – 8 March 1866) was a French Catholic missionary to Asia, and a member of the Paris Foreign Missions Society who was canonized as a saint.  Berneux was executed in the anti-Christian purges at Saenamteo, Seoul, Korea, in 1866. His death provoked the French campaign against Korea the same year.

Biography
Siméon-François Berneux was born in Château-du-Loir on 14 May 1814 and entered the Seminary of Foreign Missions in 1831 at the age of seventeen.  In 1843 he entered the Seminary of Le Mans to complete his studies. He was ordained on 20 May 1837 and appointed as Professor of Theology at the Foreign Missions Seminary in October 1838.

Berneux departed from Le Havre on 12 February 1840 and arrived at Anyer in Java on 31 May.  He spent the summer in Manila before sailing to Macau.  In January 1841 he sailed to Tonkin.  In Vietnam he was imprisoned and taken to Huế for trial, where he arrived on 28 May. In 1842 he was convicted of proselytism and sentenced to death, a sentence which was indefinitely postponed.  He was released on 12 March 1843 and set sail to return to France.  However, at the Isle of Bourbon (now Réunion), he received permission to return to Macao.  He was appointed to begin missions in Manchuria, and arrived in the Liaodong Peninsula on 15 March 1844.

Berneux was consecrated as bishop on 27 December 1854, appointed titular bishop of Capsus and Apostolic Vicar of Corea. The previous Apostolic Vicar of Korea, Jean-Joseph-Jean-Baptiste Ferréol, had been consecrated in 1843 and ministered in Korea from 1845 until his death in 1853.  Berneux sailed from Shanghai to Korea in January 1856 on a Chinese ship, arriving in Korean waters on 15 March. They met a vessel owned by Korean Christians on Good Friday and were landed near Seoul.  Entering the city on foot, Berneux and his company were taken to the house of Marie-Nicolas-Antoine Daveluy, a French priest who had come to Korea along with Bishop Ferréol.  Berneux set up a residence in Seoul, living and working secretly. 

In 1866 Berneux was arrested and put on trial.  In February 1866 he was repeatedly interrogated under torture, and sentenced to death.  He was executed by decapitation on 8 March 1866 at Saenamteo outside Seoul.  Daveluy served as Apostolic Vicar for a short time until he was also executed on 30 March. The deaths of Berneux and other Catholic missionaries in Korea was followed by a French punitive expedition which reinforced the Korean policy of isolationism.

Canonization
Berneux was beatified by Pope Paul VI on 6 October 1968 and canonized on 6 May 1984 by Pope John Paul II.  His feast day is 7 March, and he is also venerated along with the rest of the 103 Korean Martyrs on 20 September.

His relics were brought to Berlin in 2001 and are held in the Institut St. Philipp Neri in Berlin, Germany.

References

Bibliography
The Lives of the 103 Martyr Saints of Korea 37: Saint Siméon François Berneux, Bishop (1814-1866) , Catholic Bishops' Conference of Korea Newsletter No. 51 (Summer 2005).
Frédéric Pichon (1872). The Life of Monseigneur Berneux, Bishop of Capse, Vicar-Apostolic of Corea. Burns, Oates, and Company, London.

LECLEIR, Stefaan, Siméon-François Berneux (1814-1866), Missionsbischof und Märtyrer in Korea, Böhlau, Köln, 2000.

External links
Profiles of Saints
 Archives of the Paris Foreign Missions Society 

1814 births
1866 deaths
19th-century French Roman Catholic priests
Korean Roman Catholic priests
Korean Roman Catholic saints
French Roman Catholic saints
Paris Foreign Missions Society missionaries
Roman Catholic archbishops of Seoul
19th-century Christian saints
19th-century Roman Catholic martyrs
19th-century executions by Korea
French people executed abroad
Executed people from Pays de la Loire
Roman Catholic missionaries in Korea
Roman Catholic missionaries in Vietnam
Roman Catholic missionaries in the Philippines
Roman Catholic missionaries in China
French expatriates in Korea
French expatriates in Vietnam
French expatriates in the Philippines
French expatriates in China
People executed by Korea by decapitation
Roman Catholic bishops of Seoul